Disterna is a genus of longhorn beetles of the subfamily Lamiinae.

Species 
Disterna contains the following species:

 Disterna annulata (Breuning, 1939)
 Disterna atrofasciculata (Aurivillius, 1916)
 Disterna bifasciata (Pascoe, 1859)
 Disterna canosa (Erichson, 1842)
 Disterna complexa (Pascoe, 1859)
 Disterna concinna (Blackburn, 1901)
 Disterna cuneata (Pascoe, 1863)
 Disterna curta (Breuning, 1939)
 Disterna forrestensis McKeown, 1948
 Disterna luctuosa (Pascoe, 1862)
 Disterna maculata (McKeown, 1938)
 Disterna mastersii Pascoe, 1871
 Disterna nigromaculata (Breuning, 1970)
 Disterna norfolkensis (McKeown, 1938)
 Disterna ovalis (Breuning, 1939)
 Disterna papuana (Breuning, 1939)
 Disterna plumifera (Pascoe, 1859)
 Disterna pumila (Pascoe, 1859)
 Disterna similis (Breuning, 1939)
 Disterna spinipennis Breuning, 1960
 Disterna tasmaniensis Breuning, 1982

References

Zygocerini